Howard Rodney "Doc" Edwards (December 10, 1938 – August 20, 2018), was an American professional baseball catcher, manager, and coach, who played in Major League Baseball (MLB) with the Cleveland Indians, Kansas City Athletics, New York Yankees, and Philadelphia Phillies, over parts of five seasons, spanning nine years. Edwards also managed the Indians, for parts of three seasons (1987-1989).

Playing career
After a tour of duty in the United States Navy in 1956-1957, where he earned his nickname "Doc" as a Navy Corpsman, the 21-year-old signed a minor league contract with the Cleveland Indians in 1958.  He was signed by Indians' scout and future Baseball Hall of Famer Ralph Kiner.   The Indians assigned him to their Class D affiliate in Nebraska, where he batted .359 and helped lead the North Platte Indians to the Nebraska State League pennant.  Over the next three seasons, Edwards continued to produce at the plate as he progressed up the Indians farm system, batting .337, .279, and .331 for the Selma Cloverleafs, Burlington Indians, and the Salt Lake City Bees respectively, before earning his call up to the major league club in 1962.

After batting .270 in 63 games in an Indians uniform, Edwards was traded to the Kansas City Athletics for Dick Howser during the 1963 season. He spent the full 1964 season with Kansas City, then was traded to the New York Yankees shortly after start of the 1965 season, where he caught 284 innings in 43 games while filling in for injured twelve-time All Star catcher Elston Howard. Following the season, he was traded back to the Cleveland Indians.

With highly regarded Cuban catcher Joe Azcue seeing most of the playing time for the Indians, and eight-time All-Star and former World Series champion Del Crandall providing senior leadership, there was no room for Edwards on the major league roster in 1966. He was sent down to the Indians AAA farm club in Portland.  After one season with the Pacific Coast League Beavers, he was sent to the Houston Astros and assigned to their PCL club in Oklahoma City, where he spent the 1967 season before being released.

He was picked up by the Philadelphia Phillies in November of that year, and after two years with their AAA affiliates in the PCL in San Diego (1968) and Eugene (1969), the Phillies named him as their bullpen coach for the 1970 season. It was this coaching assignment, and not his four years as a AAA player, which would guide his path back to playing in the major leagues. In June 1970, a series of injuries left the Phillies short a catcher where they activated the then 33-year-old Edwards. Doc responded with two hits and caught a Jim Bunning–Dick Selma two-hitter.  In his unlikely return to the major leagues that season, Edwards caught 35 games and batted .269 for the Phillies in what would prove to be the final season of his playing career.

Coaching and managing career
In 1973, the 36-year-old Edwards was named Manager of the West Haven Yankees of the Class AA Eastern League, beginning a 40-year journey that would see him manage over 3,800 games in 33 seasons for 12 teams.

Following a two-year stint in West Haven (1973–74), Edwards was hired by the Chicago Cubs, and he managed their AA affiliate in Midland, Texas, in 1975, and their AAA club in Wichita in 1976.

From there he managed the Montreal Expos’ AA Quebec Metros (1977) and AAA Denver Bears (1978), before moving over to the Baltimore Orioles, where he was assigned to the International League's Rochester Red Wings. He spent three years at the helm of the Red Wings (1979-1981), where he managed in one of the most memorable games in minor league lore.  In April 1981, the Red Wings and Pawtucket Red Sox played in a 33-inning marathon, which remains as the longest game in professional baseball history.

In 1982, Edwards was presented with the opportunity to return to his home state, and to the major league club that gave him his first shot in professional baseball.  The Cleveland Indians assigned him to the AAA International League Charleston Charlies, located in the West Virginia capital not far from his hometown of Red Jacket.  He managed the Charlies in 1982 and 1983, before the franchise was uprooted to Maine, where he continued with the team (rechristened as the Maine Guides), for two more years (1984–85).

Unfortunately for Edwards, the Indians futility continued (they had only two winning seasons between 1968 and 1987). On a positive note, despite the Indians finishing dead last that season, his 30-45 record through the remainder of the season was enough to garner a vote for the AL Manager of the Year Award. In his only full season in 1988, the Indians showed a 17-game improvement over the previous season, finishing 78-84 in the loaded AL East.

With hopes of continued improvement in 1989, the Tribe started 54-54 and found themselves within 1 games of first place in early August. But the team lost 24 of their next 35 games to fall from contention.  On September 10, with a 65-78 record, Edwards was relieved of his duties with 19 games remaining in the  season and replaced by scout John Hart.

Edwards also managed the independent Atlantic City Surf to the championship during their inaugural season of the Atlantic League of Professional Baseball in 1998. He was the manager for the San Angelo Colts, a team in the independent United League Baseball, through 2014, having managed this team for 6 years.

At the 2006 National Baseball Hall of Fame induction ceremony, new inductee Bruce Sutter thanked Doc Edwards for his help in developing Sutter's signature split-finger fastball while managing Sutter with the Midland Cubs of the Texas League in 1975.

Awards
On September 2, 2009, Edwards was awarded the 2009 United League Baseball Manager of the Year award.

Death
Edwards died on August 20, 2018, at the age of 81.

References

External links

1936 births
2018 deaths
People from Mingo County, West Virginia
Military personnel from West Virginia
Cleveland Indians managers
Cleveland Indians players
Kansas City Athletics players
Toledo Mud Hens players
New York Yankees players
Philadelphia Phillies coaches
Philadelphia Phillies players
New York Mets coaches
Major League Baseball catchers
Major League Baseball bullpen coaches
Baseball players from West Virginia
Buffalo Bisons (minor league) managers
Salt Lake City Bees players
Eugene Emeralds players
Oklahoma City 89ers players
Burlington Indians players (1958–1964)
Selma Cloverleafs players
Sioux Falls Canaries managers
San Diego Padres (minor league) players
Portland Beavers players
North Platte Indians players
Cleveland Indians coaches
Rochester Red Wings managers
Caribbean Series managers
MiraCosta Spartans baseball players